Lyn James (13 November 1929 – 31 May 2017), credited also as Marilyn James, was a Welsh-born actress of stage and screen and director, who became known for her career in England and later Australia, particularly as receptionist Helen Gordon in television soap opera The Young Doctors

Biography
She was born Margaret James, the daughter of theatre actor and producer Jack James and granddaughter of photographer Levi Ladd. and grew up in Rhondda in South Wales. After graduating  from RADA, James made her professional debut as an actress in 1949, appearing in numerous plays and TV serials in England for the BBC. After meeting her husband they emigrated to Australia in 1965, and, credited now as "Lyn James", appeared in numerous Crawford Productions series, before she became best known internationally for her role as doctors secretary Helen Gordon in the Australian television soap opera The Young Doctors. She appeared in the series from its inception in 1976, until it ended in 1983, one of only a few actors to appear for the duration of the series.

Filmography

TELEVISION

Personal life
James was married to the New Zealand producer Eric Tayler, a fellow RADA graduate, and they had two children, one of whom is the Australia actress Sally Tayler, who also appeared with her in The Young Doctors.

James final screen appearance was in 2002 and she died in Sydney, Australia, aged 87, on 31 May 2017.

References

External links
 

1929 births
2017 deaths
Australian soap opera actresses
Welsh soap opera actresses
Welsh emigrants to Australia
Alumni of RADA
People from Rhondda